is a song recorded by Japanese duo Yoasobi from their second EP, The Book 2 (2021). It was released as a stand-alone digital single on July 2, 2021, through Sony Music Entertainment Japan. The song was featured as a background music for NTT Docomo's mobile service Ahamo advertisement, and based on the novel RGB written by Yūichirō Komikado. The lyrics depict relationships between childhood friends that are still connected even though they live together in different places.

Commercially, the song debuted atop Oricon Digital Singles Chart with 57,000 download units, number three on the Combined Singles Chart, and number four on Billboard Japan Hot 100. The song also charted in the top 40 of Billboard Global 200 and the top 20 of Global Excl. U.S. The English version, titled "RGB", was released on July 16, 2021, and included on the duo's first English-language EP E-Side (2021).

Background and release

Ahamo, NTT Docomo's new mobile service released and started to broadcast a new advertisement featured Yoasobi's new song titled "Sangenshoku" on February 24, 2021, starring Nana Mori and Fūju Kamio. The song was based on a novel titled RGB, which was written by Gekidan No Meets scriptwriter Yūichirō Komikado. It is about the three childhood friends who have been estranged since elementary school due to a trivial matter and reunited as an adult. The full version of the based novel was released on March 19, along with the special interview from Yoasobi about the song via the special website for Ahamo × Yoasobi.

On June 14, "Sangenshoku" cover artwork was unveiled on the special website of the collaboration of Yoasobi and Uniqlo's T-shirt brand UT. On June 25, Yoasobi announced to release the song to digital music and streaming platforms on July, 2, the same day with "Into the Night", the English version of "Yoru ni Kakeru" and the stand-alone single version of "Encore", and aired the full song on June 29 on their radio show Yoasobi's All Night Nippon X. Later, the song was included on their second EP The Book 2, released on December 1.

On July 7, the duo announced to release the English version of "Sangenshoku", titled "RGB" on July 16, alongside the accompanying music video, and aired the full song for the first time on July 13, on their radio show Yoasobi's All Night Nippon X. It is the second English-language song after "Into the Night" and translated by Konnie Aoki. Later, the song was included on the duo's first English-language EP E-Side, scheduled for release on November 12.

Composition and lyrics

"Sangenshoku" is a pop song with Latin music influence, written by Ayase, a member of the group. It was based on RGB, a novel written by Yūichirō Komikado, and composed in the key of F minor, 128 beats per minute with a running time of 3 minutes and 44 seconds. Lyrically, "Sangenshoku" expresses the reunion with friends in their childhood. Ayase put the message in the song, "In a world where you can't meet the people you want, the thread of relationships between people is still connected". The song also features the rapping part for the first time.

Critical reception

Mikiki Ryūtarō Amano has described "It is a great song that seems to be a condensed version of J-pop, Vocaloid culture, and J-rock, and the pop music of the era when hip-hop became the standard for the past 10 years". Utaten MarSali wrote that "the song brings out the freshness of youth from the original which depicts changes in position and emotions and the beautiful friendship that does not change", and "it's a fresh song that expresses the expectation and cheerful mood when you meet your dear friends".

Commercial performance

In Japan's Oricon weekly chart issue dated July 12, 2021, "Sangenshoku" debuted at number one on the Digital Single (Single Track) Chart with 56,910 download units with 3 days selling, following "Mō Sukoshi Dake" that released on May, becoming the sixth song that charted number one on the chart and made Yoasobi becoming the second most number-one song artist on the Oricon Digital Single Chart history ("Yoru ni Kakeru", "Gunjō", "Kaibutsu", "Yasashii Suisei", "Mō Sukoshi Dake", and "Sangenshoku"), along with Bump of Chicken. The song also peaked at number three on both the Combined Singles Chart and Streaming Chart.

"Sangenshoku" debuted at number four on Billboard Japan Hot 100 for the chart issue date of July 7, 2021, with 8,867 points, behind BTS' "Butter", NEWS' "Burn", and Kenshi Yonezu's "Pale Blue". The song also debuted number one on the Download Songs chart with 49,769 download units and number 21 on the Streaming Songs chart with 3,802,915 streams. On Billboard Global 200 and Global Excl. U.S charts of July 17, "Sangenshoku" debuted at numbers 31 and 15, respectively.

Music video

Ahamo Special Movie for the short version of "Sangenshoku" was released on March 30, 2021, directed by Mado Matsumoto and illustrated by Jun Mutsuki. The Special Movie shows a live-action and animation of the emotional changes until the three protagonists meet again, and the scenes of their memories are expressed in a fused and vivid image.

The accompanying music video was premiered on July 3 and handled by animation studio CloverWorks. It shows the world view of the novel RGB. The English version music video was premiered on July 16, the same day with the English version song.

Live performance

Yoasobi performed "Sangenshoku" for the first time at the free online concert collaborated with Uniqlo's T-shirt brand UT, Sing Your World via the duo's official YouTube channel on July 4, 2021, where the song was the number one. The duo will give the television debut performance of the song at the 6-hour special edition of TV Asahi's Music Station, titled Music Station Ultra Super Live 2021 on December 24.

Track listing

Digital download and streaming

  – 

Digital download and streaming (English version)

 "RGB" –

Credits and personnel

Credits adapted from The Book 2 liner notes and YouTube.

Song

 Ayase – producer, songwriter
 Ikura – vocals
 AssH – guitar, chorus
 Honogumo – chorus
 Hikaru Yamamoto – chorus
 Zaquro Misohagi – chorus
 Yūichirō Komikado – based story writer
 Takayuki Saitō – vocal recording
 Masahiko Fukui – mixing
 Tata – cover artwork design

Ahamo Special Movie

 Sō Matsumoto – director
 Jun Mutsuki – illustrator

Music video

 Masashi Ishihama – storyboard, director, key animation
 Syōko Nakamura – character design, animation director, key animation
 Akihiro Sueta – key animation
 Kaori Itō – key animation
 Ryōsuke Nishii – key animation
 Keiko Nakaji – key animation
 Emiko Shimura – key animation
 Shinobu Mōri – key animation
 Aiko Komamoto – key animation
 Yumi Kobayashi – key animation
 Minami Seki – key animation
 Kazuaki Shimada – key animation
 Mikiko Ura – key animation, in-between animation checking, in-between animation
 Aiko Sonobe – key animation
 Yuki Akutagawa – key animation
 Yui Nakayama – in-between animation checking, in-between animation
 Hikari Imoto – in-between animation
 Rie Sukenaga – in-between animation
 Saori Noda – in-between animation
 Azusa Taniguchi – in-between animation
 Minami Nakamura – in-between animation
 EOTA – in-between animation
 Asuka Yokota – color scheme design, color style, color checking
 Yūko Watanabe – scanning, painting
 Akane Edagawa – scanning, painting
 Rumi Igarashi – scanning, painting
 Kōsuke Shimada – scanning, painting
 Kaoru Okuhara – scanning, painting
 Momoka Tsuji – scanning, painting
 Rina Iwabuchi – scanning, painting
 Miku Marikawa – scanning, painting
 Usui Hisayo – art director, background art
 Izumi Ozawa – background art
 Yayoi Okashima – background art
 Makiko Hirasawa – background art
 Boundary – 3D CGI
 Katsuaki Miyaji – CG works
 Miyuki Kumagai – CG works
 Minoru Tōya – CG works
 Shō Watanabe – CG production assistant
 Yūya Sukuma – compositing director, compositing
 Ruri Satō – compositing
 Sachiko Itō – compositing
 Kaito Ishizaka – compositing
 Natsu Ishioka – compositing
 Hirohisa Kitamura (Silver Link) – plug-in cooperation
 Nami Niinuma – editing
 Q-Tec – online editing
 Nobutaka Yoda (10Glauge) – CM editor
 Kenta Suzuki (Aniplex) – planning cooperation
 Yūichi Fukushima – animation producer
 Kōta Takano – production manager
 Honoka Katō – production setting production
 CloverWorks – animation production
 Akira Ushioda – translation co-operation

Charts

Weekly charts

Year-end charts

Certifications

Release history

References

External links
  
 English version of RGB

2021 singles
2021 songs
Japanese-language songs
Songs used as jingles
Sony Music Entertainment Japan singles
Yoasobi songs